Ludwig van Beethoven (1770–1827) was a German composer and pianist.

Ludwig van Beethoven may also refer to:

Ludwig van Beethoven (1712–1773), German singer, music director, and grandfather of the composer
Ludwig van Beethoven (Baerer), a series of sculptures in the United States